Ross MacLachlan (born 1957) is an accomplished pianist living in Eastern Ontario near Kingston.  Specializing in ragtime, boogie and stride-piano styles, he has delighted live-music lovers with hundreds of performances while accompanied by other talented musicians including the likes of Gary Barratt, Patty Smith, Tim Roberts, Lynne Hanson, Nora Peterson and Spencer Evans.

He performed for Diana, Princess of Wales, on her visit to Kingston, Ontario in October 1991.

His music has been featured on several national radio broadcasts including the CBC Radio's The Vinyl Cafe with Stuart McLean.

Discography
Not Just Ragtime (Real Shiny Records, 2008)

References

External links
 Official Site

1957 births
20th-century Canadian male musicians
Canadian male pianists
Living people
Musicians from Ontario
20th-century Canadian pianists